Michael Rudolph (1758–1795), an officer in the United States Army,  served as acting Adjutant General and acting Inspector General of the U.S. Army in 1793.

Background
Rudolph was born in Elkton, Maryland of parents of German descent, and received no formal education. In April 1778, at around the age of twenty, he enlisted in Lee's Legion, where he served for the duration of the American Revolutionary War. He was commissioned a Lieutenant in July 1779, and in September 1779 was brevetted a Captain for his actions in the Battle of Paulus Hook. He was discharged at the conclusion of the war and returned to civilian life.

Final years and death
He returned to the Army in June 1790, as a captain in the 1st U.S. Infantry  He was promoted to Major commanding the Squadron of Light Dragoons in March 1792. In February 1793, he was made acting Adjutant General and acting Inspector General of the U.S. Army. Shortly afterward, he was given command of Fort Hamilton, Ohio. There, he refused to postpone the execution of several soldiers for desertion even though he knew an appeal of their case was pending. Moments after the execution was carried out, a messenger arrived with orders reprieving some of the executed men. The execution infuriated Rudolph's commander, General Anthony Wayne, who ordered Rudolph's resignation in July 1793. Accounts say he returned home to find his wife had been unfaithful, and went to sea to seek his fortune, where he was captured and killed by pirates.

A legend which circulated in the mid-19th century had Rudolph making his way to France where he became the military commander Michel Ney.

See also
List of Adjutant Generals of the U.S. Army
List of Inspectors General of the U.S. Army
 The American Revolution Institute
 The Society of the Cincinnati

References

Metcalf, Bryce (1938) Original Members and Other Officers Eligible to the Society of the Cincinnati, 1783-1938: With the Institution, Rules of Admission, and Lists of the Officers of the General and State Societies Strasburg, VA: Shenandoah Publishing House, Inc., p. 273.

Further reading

1758 births
1795 deaths
Adjutants general of the United States Army
American people of the Northwest Indian War
Continental Army officers from Maryland
Inspectors General of the United States Army
People from Elkton, Maryland
People killed by pirates
People lost at sea